The Tajikistan First League is the second division of the Tajikistan Football Federation.

Season events
On 9 April, the Tajikistan Football Federation announced the 12 teams that would participate in this seasons competition.

Teams

League table

Season statistics

Top scorers

References

Tajikistan First League seasons
1
Tajik